Desert Shore or Desert Shores may refer to:

Desert Shores, California, a census-designated place in California, U.S.
Desert Shores (film), a 2018 independent film 
Desertshore, a 1970 album by Nico
The Desert Shore: Literatures of the Sahel, a book by U.S. author Christopher Wise